Hið íslenzka fornritafélag, or The Old Icelandic Text Society is a text publication society. It is the standard publisher of Old Icelandic texts (such as the Sagas of Icelanders, Kings' sagas and bishops' sagas) with thorough introductions and comprehensive notes.

The Society was founded in 1928 by Jón Ásbjörnsson and launched its text series of medieval Icelandic literature known as Íslenzk fornrit in 1933. The series was founded as an Icelandic language edition along the lines of the German language series Altnordische Saga-Bibliothek (published 1892–1929). The Society's publications are distributed by the Icelandic Literary Society (Hið íslenska bókmenntafélag).

The president of the company (2019) is Halldór Blöndal.

External links
 Official site
 Íslenzk fornrit series catalogue in English (PDF; 847 kB) (includes a detailed history of the society, 1928–2018)

Academic publishing companies
Sagas of Icelanders
1928 establishments in Iceland
Text publication societies